Dzibilchaltún (Yucatec: Ts'íibil Cháaltun) is a Maya archaeological site in the Mexican state of Yucatán, approximately  north of state capital of Mérida.

Location
The region between Dzibilchaltún and the sea coast is less suitable for human habitation, being either mangrove swamps or bare rock.

Overview 
The site has been continuously occupied for thousands of years, although it has expanded into a mid-sized city and contracted back to a small town more than once in its long history. It is about 30 minutes north of Mérida, and about the same distance south of the location of the impact site of the meteorite that killed the dinosaurs in Chicxulub.

Architecture 

The most famous structure is the Temple of the Seven Dolls, so named because of seven small effigies found at the site when the temple was discovered under the ruins of a later temple pyramid by archaeologists in the 1950s. On the vernal equinox, the site is crowded by visitors observing the sunrise through the temple's doorways. However, there is no archaeological feature marking the observation spot, making any relationship between the orientation of the temple with the equinoxes highly unlikely. The temple is connected to the rest of the site by a sacbe, or "white road," so-called because they were originally coated with white limestone, built over stone-and-rubble fill.

Surroundings 

The other major feature of Dzibilchaltún is its cenote, Cenote Xlakah, located around the center of the city's ruins. It is thought that the availability of this source of clean drinking water influenced the builders' choice of the location. Archaeological findings retrieved from the cenote by divers indicate that it was the center of a religious cult. These days the cenote is used as a swimming hole by local residents and tourists year round.

Similar to Chichen Itza, a large number of archaeological pieces like carved bones and wooden objects, but mainly vases, have been found in the cenote. Valuable information about the ancient Mayans who lived near the cenote was found here.

Dzibilchaltún also contains the ruin of a 16th-century Spanish church built at the site after the conquest.

The Dzibilchaltun archeological site also includes a visitor center with maps, restrooms and gift shops. The renovated museum housing Mayan artifacts located at the site has re-opened. The museum is closed on Mondays.

National park
Dzibilchantún National Park was designated in 1987, and covers an area of 5.39 km2. It is managed by the National Commission of Natural Protected Areas (CONANP).

The natural vegetation of the area is dry forest.

See also 
List of Mesoamerican pyramids
List of sinkholes of Mexico

References

External links
 Dzibilchaltún Photo Essay
Dzibilchaltún on TripAdvisor for ratings and tours

Maya sites in Yucatán
Former populated places in Mexico
Tourism in Mexico
Mesoamerican sites
Sinkholes of Mexico
Tourist attractions in Yucatán
Museums in Yucatán
Archaeological museums in Mexico
Landforms of Yucatán
1950s archaeological discoveries
Underwater diving sites in Mexico
National parks of Mexico